Cansunco is a village in the Bafatá Region of southern-central Guinea-Bissau. It lies to the northwest of Chumael.

References

Populated places in Guinea-Bissau
Bafatá Region